Cooking with Paris is an American six-part reality cooking show presented by Paris Hilton. It was released on August 4, 2021, on Netflix. In January 2022, Netflix cancelled the series after its first season.

Premise
An unscripted cooking series filmed in her home, Cooking with Paris follows Hilton tackling new recipes and "unusual kitchen appliances". Each episode guest stars one of her celebrity friends, with the final episode featuring both Kathy and Nicky Hilton.

Cast 
 Paris Hilton as host

Guests
 Kim Kardashian
 Nikki Glaser
 Demi Lovato
 Saweetie
 Lele Pons
 Kathy Hilton
 Nicky Hilton Rothschild

Episodes

Production 
On July 27, 2021, Netflix announced a six-part reality cooking series presented by Paris Hilton, following a viral YouTube video Hilton posted in January 2020, which showed her cooking a homemade lasagna. The show is executive produced by Hilton for Slivington Manor Entertainment, and Aaron Saidman, Eli Holzman, and Rebecca Hertz for The Intellectual Property Corporation. On January 17, 2022, Netflix canceled the series after one season.

Release 
On July 27, 2021, Netflix released a trailer for Cooking with Paris. On August 4, 2021, the platform released the series.

Reception
Cooking with Paris received mostly negative reviews from critics. On the review aggregator website Rotten Tomatoes, it has an approval rating of 29% based on 21 reviews, with the consensus, "Cooking with Paris has the potential to delight, but by stranding Hilton's persona so deep in her past it feels like a missed opportunity for her to begin something new." Metacritic, which uses a weighted average, assigned a score of 34 out of 100 based on 10 critics, indicating "generally unfavorable reviews". The series ranked at number one (tied with Alter Ego) on Metacritic's Worst TV Shows of 2021 list. 

Jordan Julian of The Daily Beast stated that the show is "an over-produced miss. [...] She seems to be trying to channel her clueless, perpetually bored Simple Life persona, but now that we know that that was just a character, it feels forced." Writing for Variety, Daniel D'Addario said: "The problem, for Hilton, is that Cooking With Paris is a disaster — an utterly unappealing sit that many viewers will tune out before the first episode has ended." Lucy Mangan of The Guardian felt that it "all gets odder as it goes on. It's not (just) that Hilton has only four phrases at her disposal ('So good', 'So bomb', 'Insane', 'So cute'), but that she is such a deadening presence."

Despite the critical response, Cooking with Paris briefly entered Netflix's Top 10 rankings in a number of territories, and earned Hilton the Best Reality Return at the 2022 MTV Movie and TV Awards.

References

External links 
 
 

2020s American reality television series
2020s American cooking television series
2021 American television series debuts
2021 American television series endings
English-language Netflix original programming
Paris Hilton